Kanwaka Township is a township in Douglas County, Kansas, USA.  As of the 2000 census, its population was 1,317.  The name is a portmanteau of the Kansas River and Wakarusa River.

Geography

The streams of Coon Creek, Deer Creek and Dry Creek run through this township.

The township contains two cemeteries, Mound and Stull.

Adjacent Townships
Lecompton Township, Douglas County (north)
Wakarusa Township, Douglas County (east)
Clinton Township, Douglas County (south)
Monmouth Township, Shawnee County (southwest)
Tecumseh Township, Shawnee County (northwest)

Transportation

Major highways
I-70, as part of the Kansas Turnpike.
U.S. Highway 40
K-10

Towns and Settlements
Although these towns may not be incorporated or populated, they are still placed on maps produced by the county.

Kanwaka, located at 
Stull, located at

Points of interest
Kanwaka Hall, located along U.S. Highway 40, the building was constructed in 1889 as the Kanwaka Congregational Church.
Barber School, a one-room schoolhouse now on federal property near Clinton Lake.

References

External links
 US-Counties.com
 City-Data.com

Townships in Douglas County, Kansas
Townships in Kansas